Ziad Raymond Abs (زياد ريمون عبس) (born August 2, 1972 in Beirut) is an activist in the Lebanese political party Free Patriotic Movement (Lebanon) and public affairs. Joining the march of former Lebanese Army Commander (1984-1988) and Prime Minister (1988-1990) General Michel Aoun (GMA). Between 1990 and 2005, he managed several responsibilities in the Free Patriotic Movement. He was expelled from the FPM, along three other  members in 2016 Acting in Beirut 1 District (Achrafieh, Rmeil, Saifi), he has been a candidate to the Parliamentary Greek Orthodox seat. The FPM's juristic council expelled him alongside Naim Aoun and Antoine Nasrallah from the FPM on Friday 29 July 2016, charged with raising the FPM's crises in the media and for rebelling against movement decisions. He is also the founder of LOGOS association and head of Achrafieh Youth Club (AYC).

Biography

Background and career
Abs is an electrical engineer and CEO of Moonlight Architectural Solutions (MAS Group) in Doha and Beirut since 1998. He is also the CEO of Petroserv SAL in Beirut since 2012.

References

Living people
Lebanese chief executives
1972 births
Lebanese activists
Electrical engineers